Justine Wise Polier (April 12, 1903 – July 31, 1987) was the first woman Justice in New York. An outspoken activist and a "fighting judge," for 38 years she used her position on the Family Court bench to fight for the rights of the poor and disempowered.

Background

Justine Wise was born April 12, 1903 in Portland, Oregon to Rabbi Stephen Wise and Louise Waterman Wise. Her father was a prominent rabbi who helped found the American Jewish Congress (1918) and the NAACP (1909). He was also a leading advocate of a Jewish state and a pro-labor activist. Her mother was an artist and social worker who founded the Free Synagogue Adoption Committee in 1916 in New York.

As a young woman, she studied labor relations and advocated for workers’ rights, while also working at Elizabeth Peabody Settlement house and a textile mill. She attended Horace Mann High School, Bryn Mawr College, Radcliffe College, and Barnard College.  In 1925, she enrolled in Yale Law School, where she eventually became editor of the Yale Law Journal.  She commuted to support the 1926 Passaic Strike.

Career

Polier began volunteering with the International Juridicial Association (IJA) in 1933 alongside her future husband Shad Polier.

Preferring social legislation to practicing law, Polier worked as the first woman referee and in 1934 Assistant Corporate Council for the Workman's Compensation Division.

In 1935, New York City Mayor Fiorello H. La Guardia made Polier a judge on the Domestic Relations Court. At age 32, she became the first woman judge in New York State.

In her time serving as judge, Polier was deeply involved in combating de facto segregation in the New York school system and institutional racism elsewhere in the public sector. She, along with Justice Jane Bolin, also fought racial discrimination by religious groups by helping to found a special school for black boys in New York. Additionally, she pushed for a psychological approach in the fight for elimination of race matching in probation.

In 1936, Polier decided In re Vardinakis, a case which she described "as 'a first baptism by religious fire.'" The decision involved a compromise between a divorcing Catholic mother and Muslim father as to the religious training of their children, drawing criticism from Catholic periodicals while at the same time shaping Jewish involvement in the future of New York's "foundling" rotation system.

Polier was also an advocate for Jewish children attempting to escape from Nazi Germany, collaborating with Eleanor Roosevelt to, albeit unsuccessfully, urge Congress to allow Jewish children to circumvent strict immigration quotas.

She also fought against race discrimination, serving as Vice-Chairman of the Subcommittee on Bill of Rights and General Welfare, where she pushed for anti-discrimination laws in the context of employment and child welfare in education. In 1942, she and Justice Jane Bolin helped pass a "Race Discrimination Amendment" penned by her husband in the New York City's appropriations budget. Polier also supported the Ives-Quinn Act, a state level anti-discrimination law which made New York the first state with a dedicated agency for employment discrimination complaints in 1945.

During what she called her "second day," Polier worked to broaden services to troubled children and their families with organizations like the Citizens' Committee for Children, the Field Foundation, and the adoption agency founded by her mother in 1916 and renamed "Louise Wise Services" by Polier, who served as president of its board of directors beginning in 1946, and the Wiltwyck School. She also served on the board of directors for the Northside Center for Child Development, founded by Mamie Clark.

Personal and death

Polier's first husband was Leon Arthur Tulin, a professor of criminal law at Yale. He died of leukemia in 1932.

Also in 1933, at the International Juridical Association, she met Shad Polier, whom she married in 1937.

She was deeply moved by the Jewish prophetic tradition of commitment to justice. Polier's concern for Jewish rights meant that, like her parents, she was a committed Zionist. She served as vice-president of the American Jewish Congress, and president of its women's division. In addition she believed that pluralism and the separation of church and state were "the essence of Americanism."

Polier's absolute commitment to justice made her a powerful advocate for poor women and children throughout her life. In the 1920s she fought for the Passaic women laborers, in the 1980s she condemned the federal ban on funding for poor women's medically necessary abortions, and she spent her retirement monitoring national juvenile detention policies for the Children's Defense Fund. Polier's ideal of justice was infused with empathy. At the same time, she insisted compassion was worthless unless accompanied by a commitment to justice. Although she had never planned to serve more than a few years in the Family Court, Polier stayed for almost four decades.

She died on July 31, 1987, in New York City.

Legacy

The Citizens' Committee for Children has held a biannual "Justine Wise Polier Symposium" as early as 2012.

See also 
 List of first women lawyers and judges in New York

References

External sources 
 
 
 Jewish Women's Archive, "JWA - Justine Wise - Introduction,"  (March 20, 2008).
 Jewish Women's Archive:  Justine Wise Polier
 Women of Valor exhibit on Justine Wise Polier at the Jewish Women's Archive
 Papers, 1892-1990. Schlesinger Library, Radcliffe Institute, Harvard University.
 Guide to the Justine Wise Polier and Eleanor Roosevelt Correspondence Collection at the American Jewish Historical Society, New York, NY.

1903 births
1987 deaths
New York (state) lawyers
Yale Law School alumni
Jewish American attorneys
Jewish anti-racism activists
Radcliffe College alumni
Barnard College alumni
Bryn Mawr College alumni
20th-century American lawyers
20th-century American judges
20th-century American women judges
Jewish women
20th-century American Jews